Richard B. Russell Dam is a concrete-gravity and embankment dam located on the Savannah River at the border of South Carolina and Georgia, creating Richard B. Russell Lake. The dam was built by the U.S. Army Corps of Engineers between 1974 and 1985 for the purposes of flood control, hydroelectricity, recreation, additional stream flow regulation, water supply, and fish and wildlife management.

History and construction
The Flood Control Act of 1966 authorized construction of a new reservoir on the Savannah River to be named Trotters Shoals Lake and Dam.  The lake and dam were renamed in 1987 after Georgia senator Richard Brevard Russell Jr. in the same bill that also renamed Clarks Hill Lake to Lake Strom Thurmond. Construction on the new dam began in 1974 and filling of the lake began in October 1983. The lake reached full pool in December 1984 and the original power plant of four  conventional turbine-generators went online in January 1985.  In 1992, the addition of four 75 MW reversible pump-turbine units was completed, giving the dam a pumped-storage hydroelectricity capability.

Dam characteristics
The concrete section houses the power plant and spillway of the dam. The spillway contains ten- tainter gates that help regulate the reservoir level along with controlling flooding.

Power plant
Four generators are conventional turbines and another four are reversible turbines. With the four-reversible turbines, the dam can be used for pumped-storage hydroelectricity by pumping water that is discharged downstream back into the reservoir; essentially "reusing" water.

Since the Russell Dam is primarily a peaking facility, the reversible pump-turbines pump water from the backwaters of Lake Thurmond into Lake Russell during off-peak hours when electricity is cheap and demand is low.  During periods of high power demand, the water is released to generate electricity. Power produced by the dam is managed by the Southeastern Power Administration.

References

External links

USACE Richard B. Russell Dam and Lake

Dams completed in 1985
Buildings and structures in Abbeville County, South Carolina
Dams in Georgia (U.S. state)
Dams in South Carolina
Buildings and structures in Elbert County, Georgia
United States Army Corps of Engineers dams
Gravity dams
Dams on the Savannah River
Pumped-storage hydroelectric power stations in the United States